Timothy Duncan Groenewald (born 10 January 1984) is an English-South African former professional cricketer. He played as a right-arm medium-fast bowler for Warwickshire, Derbyshire, Somerset and Kent County Cricket Clubs before retiring during the 2021 season. He was born in Pietermaritzburg, South Africa but holds a British passport through his mother and, as a result, played as a domestic player in county cricket.

Groenewald first played for Warwickshire's Second XI in the 2004 season, as a 20-year-old. After one further season as a Second XI bowler, including a run to the semi-final of the Second XI Trophy of 2005, Groenewald made his County Championship debut in April 2006, taking two wickets. He continued to play for the first team on a semi-regular basis, and was part of the Warwickshire team which played host to the touring West Indies A team in July 2006. Groenewald was part of the Warwickshire team which won the Second XI Trophy in the 2006 season. He signed for Derbyshire in October 2008 after his Warwickshire contract was cancelled by mutual consent.

He enjoyed a good first season with Derbyshire in 2009, taking 34 first-class wickets and was rewarded with a new contract which was to see him through to the end of the 2010 season.

In June 2014, Somerset announced the signing of Groenewald on loan for the remainder of the season, at the end of which he signed a three-year permanent contract.

In September 2019 Groenewald signed a two-year contract with Kent. He played in nine matches during the COVID-19 shortened 2020 season, taking seven wickets, but retired in July 2021 after failing to recover quickly enough following surgery on his knee in April. He stayed with Kent as a coach for the remainder of their 2021 season.

References

External links

1984 births
South African cricketers
Living people
Warwickshire cricketers
Derbyshire cricketers
Somerset cricketers
North v South cricketers
Alumni of Maritzburg College
South African emigrants to the United Kingdom
English cricketers
South African people of British descent